Ranu Anant Prabhu Desai (born 8 July 1945) is an Indian politician and social worker from Goa. He is a former member of the Goa Legislative Assembly, representing the Sanguem Assembly constituency from 1989 to 1994.

Early and personal life
Ranu Anant Prabhu Desai was born at Rivona, India. He completed his Secondary School Certificate. He is married to Shubha Desai, an agriculturist. Desai currently resides at Colomba, Rivona.

Positions held
 Director of Goa Milk Producers Union
 Chairman of Rushivan Dairy Co-operative Society
 Director of Sugar Factory, Sanguem
 Member of Committee on Public Undertakings 1990, 1991–92 
 Member of Library Committee 1990
 Member of Committee on Privileges 1991–92

References

Living people
1945 births
Goan people
Goa MLAs 1989–1994
People from South Goa district
Maharashtrawadi Gomantak Party politicians
Indian politicians